Egilsstaðir is a town in east Iceland on the banks of the Lagarfljót river.

It is part of the municipality of Múlaþing and the largest settlement of the Eastern Region with, as of 2020, a population of 2,522 inhabitants. Formerly Egilsstaðir was part of Norður-Múlasýsla.

Overview
The town is young, even by Icelandic standards where urbanization is a fairly recent trend compared to mainland Europe. It was established in 1947 as an effort by the surrounding rural districts recognizing it had become a regional service centre. The town, which is named after Egilsstaðir farm, is near the bridge over Lagarfljót where all the main roads of the region meet, Route 1 as well as the main routes to the Eastern Region.

Egilsstaðir has grown to become the largest town of East Iceland and its main service, transportation, and administration centre. The town has an airport, college, and a hospital. The town grew quickly during the economic boom in the region from 2004 to 2008 associated with the building of the Kárahnjúkar Hydropower Plant and Alcoa's aluminium smelting plant in Reyðarfjörður. The growth has slowed markedly since the banking collapse in 2008.

History
In written accounts, Egilsstaðir is first mentioned in the 15th century as a place for legislative assembly. The nearby river Eyvindará is mentioned in the Saga of the Sons of Droplaug and Saga of the inhabitants of Fljótsdalur.
 
Urbanization in Egilsstaðir can be traced to Jón Bergsson (1855–1923), a farmer, who laid the groundwork for increased commerce and services at the Egilsstaðir farm by erecting a large residential building there at the start of the 20th century. The house is still in use as a hotel. Jón bought the farm Egilsstaðr at the close of the 19th century because of its location when he predicted "Crossroads will be here", which proved prescient.
Along with others, Jón Bergsson also took the initiative to establish the co-operative Kaupfélag Héraðsbúa (KHB) with headquarters there in 1909.

In subsequent years, bridges were built over Lagarfljót river and Eyvindará  river and a road made over Fagridalur to Reyðarfjörður. Later, the regional headquarters for mail and telephone services were located at Egilsstaðir.

In 1947 Egilsstaðir was incorporated as a town and a rural jurisdiction Egilsstaðahreppur, with neighbouring jurisdictions Vallahreppur and Eiðahreppur joining the new jurisdiction. The town soon grew and by 1980 the population exceeded 1000. In 1987, the status of the town was upgraded to kaupstaður and renamed Egilsstaðabær, or the town of Egilsstaðir. In early 2011, the population was 2,257 and had increased by 41 percent from 2001, when 1,600 were registered there.

On 7 June 1998 Egilsstaðabær was united with Vallahreppur, Skriðdalshreppur, Eiðahreppur and Hjaltastaðarhreppur under the name Austur-Hérað. Austur-Hérað then became Fljótsdalshérað in 2004. In 2020 it joined other municipalities to form Múlaþing.

Climate
Depending on isotherm Egilsstaðir has a subarctic climate (Köppen: Dfc) or a subpolar oceanic climate (Cfc) bordering very closely on a Tundra climate (ET). Winters there tend to be colder than other towns in the area, and summers tend to have daytime highs often exceeding , higher than most of Iceland, but at night it is colder than most towns with a similar climate. The town being at a relatively low elevation somewhat shielded from maritime winds enables warmer air to stay for longer than in coastal areas, although the effect of southerlies become negated by high mountains blocking such winds, and as a result Egilsstaðir still has a lot cooler summers than continental Nordic climates have on similar latitudes. Egilsstaðir being relatively close to the east coast also increased the maritime moderation both in summer and winter. With Central Iceland being at a highland tundra, the Egilsstaðir area is still the warmest for 1961–1990 summer maxima among Icelandic weather stations for populated areas.

The climate has significantly warmed in recent years, as seen in the climate averages for the 1991–2020 reference period.

Points of interest

 Eiðar longwave transmitter
 Kárahnjúkar Hydropower Plant
 Hallormsstaðaskógur – the biggest forest in Iceland
 Hengifoss – a waterfall in Fljótsdalur
 Skriðuklaustur – the mansion of writer Gunnar Gunnarsson
 Öxi – mountain road between Egilsstaðir and Djúpivogur

Notable natives
Sveinn Birkir Björnsson – former editor of the Reykjavík Grapevine
Sigmar Vilhjálmsson – Iceland TV host
Hjálmar Jónsson – Iceland national team footballer
Vilhjálmur Einarsson, triple-jump athlete, silver medal winner at the 1956 Olympic games
Magnús Ver Magnússon, four times World's Strongest Man (1991, 1994, 1995, and 1996)

References

External links

Populated places in Eastern Region (Iceland)
Populated places established in 1947
1947 establishments in Iceland